The men's 1500 metres event at the 2023 European Athletics Indoor Championships was held on 2 March 2023 at 21:05 (heats) and on 3 March at 20:40 (final) local time.

Medalists

Records

Results

Heats
Qualification: First 3 in each heat (Q) and the next 3 fastest (q) advance to the Final.

Final

References

2023 European Athletics Indoor Championships
1500 metres at the European Athletics Indoor Championships